In probability theory, the martingale representation theorem states that a random variable that is measurable with respect to the filtration generated by a Brownian motion can be written in terms of an Itô integral with respect to this Brownian motion.

The theorem only asserts the existence of the representation and does not help to find it explicitly; it is possible in many cases to determine the form of the representation using Malliavin calculus.

Similar theorems also exist for martingales on filtrations induced by jump processes, for example, by Markov chains.

Statement

Consequently,

Application in finance
The martingale representation theorem can be used to establish the existence
of a hedging strategy.
Suppose that  is a Q-martingale process, whose volatility  is always non-zero.
Then, if  is any other Q-martingale, there exists an -previsible process , unique up to sets of measure 0, such that  with probability one, and N can be written as:

The replicating strategy is defined to be:
 hold  units of the stock at the time t, and
 hold  units of the bond.

At the expiration day T, the value of the portfolio is:

and it's easy to check that the strategy is self-financing: the change in the value of the portfolio only depends on the change of the asset prices .

See also
 Backward stochastic differential equation

References

Montin, Benoît. (2002) "Stochastic Processes Applied in Finance" 
Elliott, Robert (1976) "Stochastic Integrals for Martingales of a Jump Process with Partially Accessible Jump Times", Zeitschrift für Wahrscheinlichkeitstheorie und verwandte Gebiete, 36, 213–226

Martingale theory
Probability theorems